Lelandais may refer to;

Marc Lelandais (b. 1966), a French Business Executive.
Nordahl Lelandais (b. 1983), a French ex-military, involved in criminal cases